Candice Carr (born June 9, 1972) is a Trinidad professional female bodybuilder. She currently lives on the island of Trinidad.

Career
Candice won her pro card in 2009. According to Candice there are no more than six female bodybuilders, including herself, on the island of Trinidad. She has said that her goal is to qualify for the Ms. Olympia.

Contest history
 1998 Junior National Body Building Championships - 2nd
 1999 Senior National Bodybuilding Championships - 2nd
 1999 Junior National Bodybuilding Championships - 1st
 2000 Senior National Bodybuilding Championships - 3rd
 2002 Central American Champions (CAC) Bodybuilding Championships - 3rd
 2002 Senior National Bodybuilding Championships - 1st
 2003 Eastern Caribbean Bodybuilding Championships - 1st
 2006 Lawrence Marshall Annual Bodybuilding Championships - 1st
 2006 Eastern Caribbean Body Building Championships - 1st
 2007 Senior National Body Building Championships - 1st
 2007 Eastern Caribbean Bodybuilding Championships - 1st
 2009 Senior National Bodybuilding Championships - 2nd
 2009 25th World Bodybuilding & Fitness Championships - 14th (heavyweight)
 2009 Central American Champions (CAC) Bodybuilding Championships, Grenada - 1st (overall and heavyweight)
 2010 IFBB Pro Bodybuilding Weekly Championships - 14th Place
 2011 IFBB Pro Bodybuilding Weekly Championships - 17th
 2011 IFBB Europa Battle of Champions - 14th
 2018 IFBB Atlantic Coast Pro Women’s Physique - 8th
 2018 St. Louis Pro Masters - 1st
 2018 St. Louis Pro Women’s Physique - 4th
 2018 Omaha Pro Women’s Physique - 15th
 2018 Legions Sports Festival Pro Women’s Physique - 3rd
 2019 Arnold Classic Pro Women’s Physique - 8th
 2019  St. Louis Pro Women’s Physique - 5th
 2019 Chicago Pro Women’s Physique - 6th
 2019 Legions Sports Festival Pro Women’s Physique - 8th

References

1972 births
Living people
Professional bodybuilders
Trinidad and Tobago female bodybuilders